Libuše Lomská (1 July 1923 – 2 November 2004) was a Czech hurdler. She competed in the women's 80 metres hurdles at the 1948 Summer Olympics.

References

External links

1923 births
2004 deaths
Athletes (track and field) at the 1948 Summer Olympics
Czech female hurdlers
Olympic athletes of Czechoslovakia